Hernsheim & Co was a German trading company in the Western Pacific Ocean with main offices on Yap (Caroline Islands), Jaluit (Marshall Islands) and Matupi (Bismarck Archipelago). The company was specialized in the copra export to Europe and tried after the loss of their possessions in the South Seas (1918), a new beginning in the French Mandate area of Cameroon (Central Africa). In the heyday of their South Sea business (circa 1882–1885), Hernsheim & Co exported almost 30% of the copra produced in the Western Pacific Ocean. Many of their agents were also dealers in ethnographic objects.

In Oceania

Founding and start capital (1875) 
Hernsheim & Co was founded in November 1875 by the brothers Franz and Eduard Hernsheim in Sydney (Australia). The start capital consisted of the South Sea stations Malakal (Koror, Palau), Nif and Tomil (Caroline Islands) and Niata (Duke of York Islands), already built by Eduard Hernsheim, and the schooner Coeran. Franz Hernsheim put in M 50,000. Furthermore, the Hamburg merchant Ruben Jonas Robertson, an uncle of the Hernsheims, offered loans.

First Expansion (1876-1882) 
Between January and August 1876 Eduard Hernsheim did new reconnaissance trips which led to the founding of Makada, a first central station for the Bismarck Archipelago on the island Makada (Duke-of-York Group). A second central station, Jaluit, was founded for the Marshall Islands on the island Jabor (Jaluit Atoll) followed. In addition, in the Ratak Chain (eastern Marshall Islands) five dealers were contracted and then probably a trading post on Ponape (formerly Pohnpei, Caroline Islands) was also founded.

From the middle of 1876, the agent J. T. Blohm made trade contacts with the Talilibai and Kabaira (northern beaches of the Gazelle Peninsula), as well as the district of Birara (southern Blanche bay, all New Britain archipelago). Until 1883 on the Gazelle Peninsula the stations Kurakaul, Ragunai, Kabaira, Vlavolo / Nogai and Pulpul / Kabaira (northern beaches), and Rolavio (port island Matupi, Blanche bay), Ruluana, Urakukuni, Ululai, Lagumgum, Tarram and Tawana (bank of the Blanche bay / District Birara) were founded.

In June 1879, due to a malaria epidemic, the central station for the New Britain archipelago was moved from Makada to Matupi. The existing on Matupi station was expanded to the factories and supplemented by a second factory on the east coast of the island.

In February 1880, at the beginning of another series of exploratory voyages, now with the small-scale Pacific and Alice, once again stations were founded, now in the village of Pakail and on the port island of Nusa (Northern New Ireland). By the agent Friedrich Schulle these trade relations were extended to the east coast of New Ireland (stations Kablaman, Butbut, Navangai, Lamerotte, Lagumbanje, Lauaru and Kapsu).

On other reconnaissance trips by Eduard Hernsheim it came only sporadically to the establishment of new stations: Woleai atoll (formerly Uleai, March 1878), Kosrae (formerly Kusaie, Caroline Islands, August 1878), Nauru (September 1878), Carcone (Hermit Islands, Western Islands, June 1879) and Oberlark (Laughlan Islands, Louisiades, beginning (?) 1881).

Franz Hernsheim took over the management of the Jaluit business in 1877 and established in early 1878 a ship connection to the Gilbert group, over which copra purchases from the islands of Apamama, Aranuka and Kuria were introduced to the central warehouse on Jabor from 1883/84. He lived on Jaluit and served as German Consul. He was still on Jaluit in 1885 at the German acquisition of the Marshalls, but left the island in January 1886 to return to Europe.

For the business on Yap in March 1878 and March 1880 the American captains C. P. Holcomb and D. D. O'Keefe were won as general agents for Yap or the St. David's island. However, these connections were resolved again in April 1884.

Introduction of an "Agent System" (1882-1885) 
The expansion of the field of activity to a large part of the western Pacific Ocean and the exploding operating costs to maintain traffic between the three main stations Yap, Jaluit and Matupi forced Hernsheim & Co to consolidate in October 1882. Instead of small drifters, the inter-island traffic was increasingly provided by cheaper sailing ships and outsourced the import and export from / to Europe on charter vessels. In the New Britain archipelago, the number of trading stations was reduced and the exchange transaction was transferred to independent agents who regulated the traffic with the local negotiators or suppliers in their own responsibility. From October 1885, through the partnership with Mouton, Dupré & Co. the former dealer Friedrich Schulle acted as a general agent for northern Gazelle peninsula, New Ireland. General agent for Yap was Robert Friedländer. He had been sent out by the Hamburg mother house since December 1883. A cutthroat competition in the Marshall Group with the German Trading and Plantation Company of the South Sea Islands of Hamburg (DHPG) forced Hernsheim & Co to unite their possessions there with those of their rivals.

Concentration on the Matupi Branch and Diversification (1886-1892) 
On the protection declaration of the German Reich over the New Kingdom archipelago (November / December 1884, renamed after that afterwards in Bismarck archipelago) reacted Hernsheim & Co with a restructuring of their company possession. The branches of the Marshall Group and the Yap group were merged with those of the German Trading and Plantation Society of the South Sea Islands of Hamburg (DHPG) to Jaluit Society (December 1887). In contrast, the Matupi branch was outsourced, taken over by Eduard Hernsheim in sole responsibility and converted into the Hernsheim & Co OHG (1888/89).

Following individual deliveries to SMS Habicht, Carola, Hyäne and Albatros, as well as to HMS Espiègle and Dart on the English side, Hernsheim & Co OHG was able to get a coal supply contract with the Imperial Navy signed by the Hamburg parent company Robertson & Hernsheim (see below) with the Royal British Navy and extend the former repeatedly until 1914. This, as well as supply contracts with small businesses and public entities in the protected area, including the Wesleyan Mission, allowed the company to cross-finance its co-buyer business and give it the competitive edge ahead of DHPG and E.E. Forsayth. Increasing profits from 1888 led to the conversion into a limited partnership (1901) and finally to the transfer into a corporation with a registered capital 1.2 million marks (1909, seat Hamburg).

Second expansion in trade and extensive plantation economy (1893-1914) 
Maximilian Thiel was in charge for the new management of the Bismarck Archipelago which included the Admiralty Islands (stations of Komuli and Manus), the Ninigo Islands, the Solomon Islands (stations Bouka and Choiseul), the St. Matthias Group and the Portland Islands. For reasons of space a new relocation of the main station was made in 1912 from Matupi to Rabaul.

An intensive plantation strategy according to the scheme of DHPG and E.E. Forsayth was applied by Hernsheim & Co. The company operated labor-intensive plantations involving the importation of foreign workers in the grasslands near Rabaul and on their property on Makada (Duke-of-York group), also on Nusa, Nusalik and in Pakail (all New Ireland). Through expanding their palm tree cultivations in 1912 the company could increase its share capital by M 600,000.

In Australia and in Cameroon

Participation in Melanesia Co. Ltd. (1928-1930) 
After the peace agreement of Versailles, all possessions of Hernsheim & Co AG in the former protected area German New Guinea were confiscated by the Australian Mandate Authority. After passing the war indemnification law (1928) the company received from Germany 13% of their recognized claim for damages i.H.v. 14 million marks plus a rebuilding surcharge of 2%. Together with the Hamburgische Südsee-Aktiengesellschaft (HASAG), Hernsheim & Co acquired a stake in the London-based Melanesia Company Ltd., which had acquired parts of the company property of both companies in the former German protected area. As a result of Black Friday (1929), the Melanesia Company ran into trouble; a joint attempt by HASAG and Hernsheim & Co to sell their shares failed. After a collapse of the copra market in the financial year 1930, the plantations and plantations run by the Melanesia Company had to be sold at such a low price that not even the preferred main creditors - which included neither HASAG nor Hernsheim & Co AG - could be satisfied.

Palm oil production in Edéa (1928-1939) 
As part of the so-called "prior compensation", Hernsheim & Co AG received a share in i.H.v. RM 900,000, - of their recognized claim for damages from the Weimar government. The former managing director for the Bismarck Archipelago, Maximilian Thiel, now CEO in Hamburg, initially invested this sum in the Dutch East Indies. From 1928 he also participated in the production of palm oil in Edéa (French Mandate of Cameroon). Because of further collapses in the copra and palm oil market, the company had to accept new heavy losses from 1930, so that a settlement was only possible through write-offs and the inclusion of a mortgage on the property in Edéa. Since 1932, the shares of Hernsheim & Co circulated only with a "memorial value" of RM 1, - in the books. After losses had been written without exception in the following years, the liquidation was initiated on January 7, 1939.

References 

This article is based on a translation of the equivalent article of the German Wikipedia

External links
 

German companies established in 1875
Economic history of Germany
Trading companies of Germany